William Pugsley  (September 27, 1850 – March 3, 1925) was a politician and lawyer in New Brunswick, Canada.

Biography
He was born in Sussex, New Brunswick, the son of William Pugsley, of United Empire Loyalist descent, and Frances Jane Hayward. He was educated at the University of New Brunswick. He studied mathematics, classics, and English and was awarded many scholarships. In his junior year he was the gold medallist of his class. He went on to study law, was admitted to the bar in 1872 and set up practice in Saint John. The University of New Brunswick awarded him a BCL in 1879 and would confer honorary degrees of DCL in 1884 and LL.D in 1918. Pugsley was created a QC on 4 February 1891.

Pugsley, a Liberal, served as Speaker of the Legislative Assembly of New Brunswick, Solicitor-General and Attorney-General in various Liberal governments before becoming the 11th premier of New Brunswick in 1907.

He resigned in September of that year to become minister of public works in the federal Liberal government of Sir Wilfrid Laurier. He served in that position until the government's defeat in the 1911 federal election, but remained as a Member of Parliament (MP) until 1917 when he was appointed the 15th lieutenant governor of New Brunswick. When his term ended in 1923, he was appointed to a federal position in charge of settling war claims, and held that position until his death. Pugsley was staying at King Edward Hotel when he fell ill and died of pneumonia in Toronto in 1925. He was buried in the Fernhill Cemetery in Saint John, New Brunswick.

Electoral record

References

 
 Biography, Government of New Brunswick

External links
 
 

1850 births
1925 deaths
Liberal Party of Canada MPs
Lieutenant Governors of New Brunswick
Members of the House of Commons of Canada from New Brunswick
Members of the King's Privy Council for Canada
Lawyers in New Brunswick
Canadian King's Counsel
People from Kings County, New Brunswick
Premiers of New Brunswick
Speakers of the Legislative Assembly of New Brunswick
University of New Brunswick alumni
University of New Brunswick Faculty of Law alumni